Zhunj Marathmoli was an Indian reality and stunt television series, anchored by Shreyas Talpade. The celebrity contestants travel to 12 different cities across Maharashtra & participate in challenging tasks that put to test courage, willpower and determination. It was started from 26 May 2014 and ended on 17 August 2014.

Contestants status

Contestants

Main entrants 
 Pandharinath Kamble - Comedian. Known for participating in Comedy Express and Fu Bai Fu.
 Aarti Solanki - Comedian. Known for participating in Fu Bai Fu.
 Megha Sampat - Choreographer.
 Swapnil Rajshekhar - Actor. Known for playing negative roles in television shows and films.
 Parag Kanhere - Chef.
 Megha Dhade - Film actress. Known for playing the character in films such as Maan Sanmaan, Superstar.
 Vikram Gaikwad - Actor and Makeup artist. Known for playing Mahadev Govind Ranade in Unch Majha Zoka.
 Hemlata Bane - Actress. Known for appearance in Mala Retiwala Navra Pahije song.
 Satish Dede - Choreographer. Also known as Vidya Sagar. He is upcoming choreographer of the industry.
 Deepti Devi - Actress. Known for playing role in the Mala Sasu Havi.
 Ruchi Savarn - Actress. Known for playing lead roles in Hindi television shows.
 Tyagraj Khadilkar - Singer.
 Manisha Kelkar - Film actress.
 Abhijit Thakur - Choreographer.

Wild card entrants 
 Neha Shitole - Actress. Known for playing comedy and negative roles in film and television shows.
 Pushkar Jog - Actor and dancer. Known for playing lead roles in Marathi films.

References

External links 
Zhunj Marathmoli at Voot

Colors Marathi original programming
Marathi-language television shows